The 1986–87 Liga Alef season saw Maccabi Hadera (champions of the North Division) and Hapoel Bat Yam (champions of the South Division) win their regional divisions, and qualify for promotion play-offs against the 11th and 12th placed clubs in Liga Artzit, Hapoel Marmorek and Hapoel Ramat Gan. Hapoel Bat Yam were the only promoted club from Liga Alef to Liga Artzit. 

At the end of the season, Liga Alef expanded from 14 to 16 clubs in each division, due to the reduction from 16 to 14 clubs in both Liga Leumit and Liga Artzit.

North Division

South Division

Promotion play-offs
A promotion-relegation play-off between the Liga Alef regional winners, Maccabi Hadera and Hapoel Bat Yam and the 11th and 12th placed clubs in Liga Artzit, Hapoel Marmorek and Hapoel Ramat Gan. Each club played the other three once.

References
Liga Alef Maariv, 26.4.87, Historical Jewish Press 
Hapoel Bat Yam promoted to Artzit, Hapoel Ramat Gan remained Maariv, 14.6.87, Historical Jewish Press 

Liga Alef seasons
Israel
3